Musino (Musa) is a rural locality (a village) in Novobayramgulovsky Selsoviet, Uchalinsky District, Bashkortostan, Russia. The population was 83 as of 2010. There are 2 streets.

Geography 
Musino is located 56 km southwest of Uchaly (the district's administrative centre) by road. Kaipkulovo is the nearest rural locality.

References 

Rural localities in Uchalinsky District